Pachyhynobius shangchengensis, the Shangcheng stout salamander, is a species of salamander in the family Hynobiidae. It is monotypic within the genus Pachyhynobius. It is named after its type locality, Shangcheng. It is endemic to the Dabie Mountains in central China (Hubei, Henan, and Anhui Provinces). Its natural habitats are subtropical moist lowland forests, montane forests, and rivers. It is threatened by habitat loss.

The Shancheng stout salamander is stout, with a cylindrical body and pronounced sexual dimorphism: the adult male develops a thick, broad head.

References

Asiatic salamanders
Monotypic amphibian genera
Amphibians of China
Endemic fauna of China
Taxonomy articles created by Polbot
Amphibians described in 1983